General Piccio may refer to:

Pier Ruggero Piccio (1880–1965), Italian Air Force general
Vicente Piccio, Jr. (1927-2015), Philippine Air Force general